Bonilla Island is a small island in the Hecate Strait west of Banks Island. The remote island features a lighthouse, upland bogs and coastal rainforests.

History 
The first colonial explorer to sail past the inhabited island was likely the island Spanish explorer Jacinto Caamaño, who apparently bestowed the name "Bonilla Island." In 1912, plans to build a light beacon were made, and it was constructed in 1927. Due to increases in marine traffic, a lighthouse, three dwellings, and a fog horn were built in 1957.

Oceanographic research

The Bonilla Island light is one of 27 staffed lighthouses, part of the British Columbia Shore Station Oceanographic Program, collecting coastal water temperature and salinity measurements for the Department of Fisheries and Oceans everyday since 1960.

Climate 
Bonilla Island has a rainy and mild Oceanic climate. (Cfb)

References

Islands of British Columbia
North Coast of British Columbia
Straits of British Columbia